Alyzon Whitestarr is a 2005 young adult novel by Isobelle Carmody.

Background
Alyzon Whitestarr was first published in Australia on 26 September 2005 by Penguin Books in trade paperback format. It was released by Random House in the United States in 2005. Alyzon Whitestarr won the 2005 Aurealis Award for best young-adult novel and the 2005 Golden Aurealis for best novel.

Synopsis
Alyzon Whitestarr does not take after her musically talented father or her nocturnal, artistic mother. She considers herself to be the most normal member of a very eccentric family until an accident changes that.

When she wakes from a coma after an accident suddenly colors are more vibrant. Her memory is flawless; but strangest of all is Alyzon's sense of smell. She can smell people's feelings, view flashes of their lives and perceive their essences. 
Her best friend smells of a comforting sea breeze. She registers her father's contentment as the sweet scent of caramelized sugar. But why does the cutest guy in school smell so rancid? With these new senses she discovers that some people's spirits have been infected by a sentient disease.

With Alyzon's extrasensory perception comes intrigue and danger, as she becomes aware of the dark secrets and hidden ambitions that threaten her family. In the end, being different might be less of a blessing than a curse.

References

External links

2005 Australian novels
Young adult fantasy novels
Australian young adult novels
Novels by Isobelle Carmody
Aurealis Award-winning works